NSF may stand for:

Political organizations
National Socialist Front, a Swedish National Socialist party
NS-Frauenschaft, the women's wing of the former German Nazi party
National Students Federation, a leftist Pakistani students' political group
Norsk Syndikalistisk Forbund, a Norwegian anarcho-syndicalist group
National Salvation Front (disambiguation), various organizations
National Secessionist Forces, a fictional rebel group in the video game Deus Ex

Other organizations
National Science Foundation, a United States government agency
National Service Framework, one of various British health policies
National Sleep Foundation, a U.S. nonprofit organization that promotes public understanding of sleep and sleep disorders
NSF International, formerly the National Sanitation Foundation, a food safety standards group
North Sea Fleet
North South Foundation, an Indian-American educational organization
Nykterhetsrörelsens Scoutförbund, a Swedish scouting organization
Norges Speiderforbund, a Norwegian scouting organization
Palestinian National Security Forces
NASASpaceFlight.com, a news website and forum covering spaceflight and aerospace engineering news
, defunct radio and television transmitter company in the Netherlands

Medicine
Nephrogenic systemic fibrosis, a disease
N-ethylmaleimide sensitive fusion protein, an enzyme and gene

Computing
NES Sound Format (.nsf), an audio file format for the Nintendo Entertainment System
Notes Storage Facility (.nsf), the file type for IBM Lotus Notes databases

Other uses
Non-sufficient funds, a cause for a bank to reject a check
New Small Family, an automobile model range
National Service Full-time, a type of conscription in Singapore
Thiazyl fluoride, an unstable gas with the chemical formula 
NSF, one of the call signs used by the radio station at the Anacostia Naval Air Station in Washington, D.C.